The 1995–96 Frauen-Bundesliga was the 6th season of the Bundesliga (women), Germany's premier football league. It was the first season in which 3 points were awarded for a win. Previously the traditional 2 points were awarded for wins. In the final the runners-up of the divisions met. TSV Siegen from the north defeated SG Praunheim 1–0 to win their sixth championship.

Northern conference

Final standings

Results

Southern conference

Final standings

Results

Semi-finals

Final

Top scorers

Qualification

Qualification North

Group North

Group South 1

SC Siegelbach renounced the right to participate in the qualification for the Bundesliga. Replacement Rot-Weiß Göcklingen received no license to participate, because they returned the necessary documents late.

Group South 2

FC Oster Oberkirchen and SV Dirmingen renounced their right to participate in the qualification.

Sources 
 "West Germany (Women) 1995/96". Rec.Sport.Soccer Statistics Foundation. 15 January 2005. Retrieved 2009-07-22.

1995-96
Ger
1
Women